Grey Lords may refer to:

 Earl Grey, a title in the Peerage of the United Kingdom
 Grey baronets, three baronetcies created for the Grey family
 Viscount Grey of Fallodon, a title in the Peerage of the United Kingdom